Edward Bradford may refer to:
Edward Bradford (1798–1871), founderof Pine Hill Plantation in Leon County, Florida.
Edward Green Bradford (1819–1884), Delaware politician and United States federal judge
Sir Edward Bradford, 1st Baronet (1836–1911), Commissioner of Police of the Metropolis, 1890–1903
Edward Green Bradford II (1848–1928), United States federal judge
Edward A. Bradford (1813–1872), lawyer and unsuccessful nominee to the United States Supreme Court
Sir Edward Eden Bradford (1858–1935), British Royal Navy admiral
Edward Bradford (botanist) (1802–1888), British army surgeon and botanist who discovered certain endemic flora of Trinidad and Tobago
Sir Edward Montagu Andrew Bradford, 3rd Baronet (1910–1952) of the Bradford baronets
(Sir) Edward Alexander Slade Bradford, 5th Baronet (born 1952) of the Bradford baronets

See also
Bradford (name)